State Highway 110 (abbreviated SH-110) is a two-lane road maintained by the U.S. state of Oklahoma. Along the way, it serves the western side of the Lake of the Arbuckles and the Chickasaw National Recreation Area. It has no spur routes.

What is now SH-110 was established as SH-7C in the late 1940s. SH-110 was established along a route ending closer to Sulphur, which replaced SH-7C. When the Lake of the Arbuckles was created and inundated the highway, the SH-110 designation was applied to the former SH-7C instead.

Route description
SH-110 begins at Broad Street in the town of Dougherty. The entirety of the route, between the town and SH-7 near Davis, is a winding, hilly route through the Arbuckle Mountains. From the town, the highway runs northeast, then turns north to parallel Rock Creek, the outlet from the Lake of the Arbuckles. As the highway approaches the lake, it spawns the access road to Camp Goddard, a youth camp on the shore of the lake. SH-110 then turns to the northwest. It then eventually assumes a due north course and ends at SH-7 on the eastern fringe of Davis.

History
The road that is now SH-110 is first shown as part of the state highway system on the 1948 official state map. The highway was originally known as State Highway 7C and was all gravel. The route roughly followed that of the present day. In 1955, SH-7C was removed from the state highway system. The new road to Dougherty was SH-110, which traveled northeast out of town and ended at SH-7 just west of Sulphur In 1957, this route was paved.

In 1965, SH-110 was decommissioned, due to the construction of Lake of the Arbuckles, the basin of which SH-110 ran through. This left Dougherty once again without direct access to the state highway system. In 1967, SH-110 was restored as a state highway along the SH-7C route. The highway was fully paved by 1968.

Junction list

References

External links

SH-110 at OKHighways

110
Transportation in Murray County, Oklahoma